Gene Farrell is a footballer from Camp, County Kerry. He played with the Kerry intercounty team during the 1990s winning Munster Championships at all levels Minor (1990), Under 21 (1992), Senior (1996).

Club
He played his club football with Annascaul and West Kerry. He helped them to the 1993 County Final where they lost out to Laune Rangers. He won two Kerry Intermediate Football Championship, one Kerry Senior Club Football Championship, one Kerry County League Div 1, one Kerry Junior Football Championship, one Munster Intermediate Club Football Championship as well as West Kerry Senior Football Championship and West Kerry titles with Annascaul.

With West Kerry he won Kerry Minor Football Championship and Kerry Under 21 Football Championship titles.

Third Level

He also won Sigerson Cups with UCG in 1992 and Tralee RTC\Tralee IT in 1997 and 1998.

Intercounty

Minor

Farrell lined out with the Kerry minor team in 1990. Appearing as a sub in wins over Tipperary and Clare on route to picking up a Munster Minor Football Championship medal. He was again as sub as Kerry drew with Galway in the All-Ireland semi-final. He did enough to warrant a start in the replay where he scored 1-02 in a 2-07 to 0-09 win. In the final Kerry faced Meath, and despite two points he couldn't help his side from a 2-11 to 2-09 loss.

Under 21

He joined the Kerry Under 21 team in 1991. He missed the Munster championship winning campaign, instead joining for the All-Ireland semi-final. He scored a goal in a 2-07 to 1-06 win over Meath. Kerry faced Tyrone in the All-Ireland final. Farrell failed to score in a heavy 4-16 to 1-05 loss.

He was again part of the team in 1992. He scored 0-02 in a Quater-final against Limerick and 1-03 in the semi-final against Waterford. He missed out on the final win over Cork.<ref>https://terracetalk.com/kerry-football/year/1992/U21<\ref>

Junior

Farrell had a brief time with the Kerry Junior team. His only appearance in a Munster championship semi-final loss to Cork.<ref>https://terracetalk.com/kerry-football/game/1020/1998-Kerry-Vs-Cork<\ref>

Senior

He joined the Kerry senior team during the 1994–95 National Football League. He played in all nine of the sides games as they lost out to Tyrone in the Quarter-final.<ref>https://terracetalk.com/kerry-football/year/1995/League<\ref> 
He made his championship debut as a sub against Tipperary in the Munster semi-final where he scored a point in a 7-13 to 1-12 win. He started in the Munster final against Cork. Despite scoring two points he ended up on the losing side on a 0-15 to 1-09 scoreline.<ref>https://terracetalk.com/kerry-football/year/1995/Championship<\ref>

He played in six of Kerry's 1995–96 National Football League.<ref>https://terracetalk.com/kerry-football/year/1996/League<\ref>
Wins over Tipperary and Waterford seen Farrell qualify for the Munster final once more when they again faced Cork. Despite not scoring himself a 0-14 to 0-11 win seen him pick up a Munster Senior Football Championship. In the All-Ireland semi-final Kerry faced Mayo. He again failed to score as Mayo ran out winners on a 2-13 to 1-10 scoreline.<ref>https://terracetalk.com/kerry-football/year/1996/Championship<\ref>

Farrell was in good form during the 1996–97 National Football League. He played in every game up to the quarter-final win over Down where he picked up an injury that ruled him out of the season and missed out as Kerry went on to win that years All-Ireland.<ref>https://terracetalk.com/kerry-football/year/1997/League<\ref>

He made a surprise return for the 2000-01 National Football League. It wasn't to be a good return as he lined out in losses to Louth and Tyrone.<ref>https://terracetalk.com/kerry-football/year/2001/League<\ref>

References

 https://web.archive.org/web/20091219221445/http://munster.gaa.ie/winning-teams/ifclub_teams/
 http://hoganstand.com/Kerry/ArticleForm.aspx?ID=44472

Year of birth missing (living people)
Living people
Kerry inter-county Gaelic footballers
Annascaul Gaelic footballers